Matthew Bailey (born 6 October 1977) is an English cricketer. He played one first-class match for Cambridge University Cricket Club in 1997.

See also
 List of Cambridge University Cricket Club players

References

External links
 

1977 births
Living people
Cricketers from Cambridgeshire
English cricketers
Cambridge University cricketers
Sportspeople from Cambridge